In chemistry, a pentagonal bipyramid is a molecular geometry with one atom at the centre with seven ligands at the corners of a pentagonal bipyramid. A perfect pentagonal bipyramid belongs to the molecular point group D5h.

The pentagonal bipyramid is a case where bond angles surrounding an atom are not identical (see also trigonal bipyramidal molecular geometry).  This is one of the three common shapes for heptacoordinate transition metal complexes, along with the capped octahedron and the capped trigonal prism.

Pentagonal bipyramids are claimed to be promising coordination geometries for lanthanide-based single-molecule magnets, since (a) they present no extradiagonal crystal field terms, therefore minimising spin mixing, and (b) all of their diagonal terms are in first approximation protected from low-energy vibrations, minimising vibronic coupling.

Examples
 Iodine heptafluoride (IF7) with 7 bonding groups
 Peroxo chromium(IV) complexes, e.g. [Cr(O2)2(NH3)3] where the peroxo groups occupy four of the planar positions.
  and

References

External links
  – Images of IF7
 3D Chem – Chemistry, Structures, and 3D Molecules 
 IUMSC – Indiana University Molecular Structure Center

Stereochemistry
Molecular geometry